Meeteetse is a town in Park County, Wyoming, United States. The population was 327 at the 2010 census.

History
The town's name is derived from a Shoshone term for "nearby".

Geography
Meeteetse is located at  (44.155954, -108.869022).

Demographics

2010 census
As of the census of 2010, there were 327 people, 153 households, and 94 families residing in the town. The racial makeup of the town was 97.6% White, 0.6% African American, 0.6% Native American, 0.6% from other races, and 0.6% from two or more races. Hispanic or Latino of any race were 1.8% of the population.

There were 153 households, of which 20.3% had children under the age of 18 living with them, 52.3% were married couples living together, 5.2% had a female householder with no husband present, 3.9% had a male householder with no wife present, and 38.6% were non-families. 33.3% of all households were made up of individuals, and 14.4% had someone living alone who was 65 years of age or older. The average household size was 2.14 and the average family size was 2.74.

The median age in the town was 51.3 years. 20.8% of residents were under the age of 18; 4.6% were between the ages of 18 and 24; 16% were from 25 to 44; 35.1% were from 45 to 64; and 23.5% were 65 years of age or older. The gender makeup of the town was 51.7% male and 48.3% female.

2000 census
As of the census of 2000, there were 351 people, 151 households, and 94 families residing in the town. The population density was 428.7 people per square mile (165.3/km2). There were 188 housing units at an average density of 229.6 per square mile (88.5/km2). The racial makeup of the town was 97.15% White, 0.28% Native American, 0.28% Pacific Islander, 0.85% from other races, and 1.42% from two or more races. Hispanic or Latino of any race were 2.56% of the population.

There were 151 households, out of which 27.2% had children under the age of 18 living with them, 56.3% were married couples living together, 4.6% had a female householder with no husband present, and 37.1% were non-families. 32.5% of all households were made up of individuals, and 15.9% had someone living alone who was 65 years of age or older. The average household size was 2.32 and the average family size was 3.00.

In the town, the population was spread out, with 24.8% under the age of 18, 5.4% from 18 to 24, 24.8% from 25 to 44, 28.5% from 45 to 64, and 16.5% who were 65 years of age or older. The median age was 40 years. For every 100 females, there were 106.5 males. For every 100 females age 18 and over, there were 95.6 males.

The median income for a household in the town was $29,167, and the median income for a family was $31,953. Males had a median income of $21,250 versus $18,125 for females. The per capita income for the town was $12,030. About 5.8% of families and 10.9% of the population were below the poverty line, including 11.6% of those under age 18 and 14.9% of those age 65 or over.

Education
Public education in the town of Meeteetse is provided by Park County School District #16. Meeteetse School, a K–12 campus, serves the town.

Meeteetse has a public library, a branch of the Park County Library System.

Arts and culture
On State Street, the main road in town, is retail shop of the Meeteetse Chocolatier, which sells gourmet chocolate to fans around the world. The business was created by saddle bronc rider Tim Kellogg as a way to make money when he needed to buy a new saddle. Kellogg continues to make every single item in his store, resulting in small batches with unusual flavors like Coor's or mesquite truffles.

There are a number of museums in Meeteetse, including the Charles Belden Museum of Western Photography, the Meeteetse Museum, and the First National Bank Museum. The Belden Museum features the photographs of Charles Belden, mostly taken in the 1920s and 1930s. The Meeteetse Museum showcases the history of Meeteetse and the surrounding area and includes exhibits on the endangered black-footed ferret, the Meeteetse Mercantile, the Forest Service Cabin, and local ranch families and cowboys. The Bank Museum is located in the old First National Bank Building, this building is on the National Register of Historic Places and has recently undergone restoration. The Bank Museum features photography and other art exhibits throughout the year, in addition to artifacts from the bank's past.

Religion 
Monks of the Most Blessed Virgin Mary of Mount Carmel have the monastery in Meeteetse.

Nature
Meeteetse was where the last known wild population of black-footed ferrets was discovered in 1981. All black-footed ferrets today are descended from these animals.

See also

 List of municipalities in Wyoming

References

External links

 
 Meeteetse Branch Library
 Meeteetse Visitors Center
 Park County School District 16, Meeteetse, WY

Towns in Park County, Wyoming
Towns in Wyoming